The 2010 Mountain West Conference baseball tournament took place from May 25 through 29. The top six regular season finishers of the league's seven teams met in the double-elimination tournament held at San Diego State's Tony Gwynn Stadium. Top seeded TCU won their fourth Mountain West Conference Baseball Championship with a championship game score of 2–0 and earned the conference's automatic bid to the 2010 NCAA Division I baseball tournament.

Seeding 
The top six finishers from the regular season were seeded one through six based on conference winning percentage only. Only six teams participate, so Air Force was not in the field.

Results

All-Tournament Team

References 

Tournament
Mountain West Conference baseball tournament
Mountain West Conference baseball tournament
Mountain West Conference baseball tournament
Baseball competitions in San Diego
College baseball tournaments in California